The Novăț is a left tributary of the Vaser in Maramureș County, Romania. There is an abandoned narrow-gauge railway (Mocăniță) in the Novăț valley, a branch line of the Vaser valley railway.

References

Rivers of Romania
Rivers of Maramureș County